Rainbow is an amusement park ride created by HUSS Maschinenfabrik of Bremen, Germany (now HUSS Park Attractions of Budapest, Hungary). The Rainbow was manufactured from 1982 to 2000 and is often confused with its cousins Ali Baba and 1001 Nachts, which are quite different. The HUSS Rainbow has developed a vast fan base due to its large stature, smooth ride, bright lights, and iconic motor noise.

Design
According to HUSS, there were 41 units produced, which were seen towering atop midways all over the world. The more popular traveling model was created plus several park models. Some units were also converted to the opposite model later in their life. It was rumored that some units were converted from its older brother Ranger, however, this has not been proven on this page yet.

After an accident in Sweden with an unmaintained driveshaft, the HUSS Rainbow started to decline. HUSS ordered the replacement of driveshafts on all remaining rainbows at a cost of about US$40,000 per unit. HUSS was sold and the project was dead. The high cost of maintaining an old ride outweighed any benefit for most parks and traveling midways, who sold or scrapped their rides.

Some midways and parks kept the ride in service. The popularity of the classic ride has led to its own Facebook page with several websites and forums dedicated to the HUSS Rainbow.

There are several Rainbows still in operation and some in storage. The most notable recent refurbishing was unveiled at the January 2014 South Florida Fair owned by Wade Shows, however, that ride is now in storage as the cost was too much to keep it running.

The Rainbow was developed in the early 1980s using the mechanics of the Ranger also built by HUSS, and adding a pivot to the end of the arm so the gondola always stays upright anywhere in its orbit. It holds 32 passengers in three rows, with 2 persons per seat with an overall capacity of about 720 riders per hour. An electronically controlled hairpin shaped handle moves into place to keep riders in a seated position; however most of the time you were floating somewhere between the seat and the bar. Later owners were required to upgrade with seat-belts for added safety.

The gondola features two statues (typically Hawaiian girls) atop the front railing of the gondola. Underneath is an illuminated cloud that can be seen from the ground. The upper end of the main arm displays a stationary cloud sign with chasing lights that spell "Rainbow" in cursive writing. This hid the two counterweights and added a higher class look. The traditional version has a double V-stripe on the main support. The overall colours changed from ride to ride, and there were some custom units created with different themes and configurations. Many units were refurbished with modern looks and lighting.

The Rainbow came packaged on three (sometimes possibly four) over-sized trailers or installed as park models. It took a crew of four, about six hours to set up and four hours to tear down. A crane is used to erect the main shaft.

When installed, it had a footprint of  x .

Operation
The ride is run manually with a joystick, although some models were programmed and ran from push-buttons.

It can move in either clockwise or counter clock-wise direction with the ability to stop or reverse at any point in its orbit. It was very customary to stop the ride in its up-most position and wait a while, then reverse directions without warning.

The Rainbow was equipped with lap bars that raise and lower electronically from the main control booth. Most models have a foot pedal to ensure the operator is present.

In about 2000, HUSS required that all Rainbows were to be fitted with seat-belts, which caused many parks to sell their old Rainbows for Ali Baba type models which features Over-The-Shoulder restraints, much faster set-up times, and a faster ride with a smaller footprint; but definitely not nearly as a thrilling ride overall.

Some owners equipped their rides with cameras so the operator could see what the riders were doing while in motion, as a deterrent for guests who would slide from under the bars or stand up while the ride was in motion.

Some models were later fitted with a flat aluminum panel instead of the clouds for easier inspection of the two driveshafts underneath the riders' seats.

Variants
Traditionally the Rainbow had a white main arm, white supports with V-stripes on it and Hawaiian girls on the gondola. There was an Aztec Rainbow and one like it. There was the Covered wagon theme (two created). Millennium was a theme for a while. The tribal rainbow was the first unit ever created.

Accidents

On July 15, 2008, 30 people were injured when a Rainbow collapsed at Liseberg theme park in Sweden. The ride was dismantled on July 17, 2008. Investigators then confirmed on July 19, 2008, that they had discovered a faulty drive shaft during their inspection. They believed that one of the axles designed to hold the passenger carriage horizontal failed. HUSS ordered the temporary closure of 40 Rainbows. The driveshaft was upgraded by HUSS in 2003, but by then many units had been scrapped or sold for parts.

On June 9, 2006, a 2-year-old boy broke his arms and legs after falling at least  from the “Over the Rainbow” ride at Dixie Landin’ in Baton Rouge, Louisiana.

Appearances 
The following is a record of HUSS Rainbow rides, their owners, locations and current status. The information gathered was known to be accurate at the time it was entered but as rides change hands often, can not always be verified as the current ride's status. New information is more than welcomed and citations are required throughout the page to ensure content quality. Any information that is not 'cited' may be removed. Items in bold are known to be the accurate current status

References

External links
 

HUSS Park Attractions
Amusement rides
Amusement rides introduced in 1982